The Virginia Marine Resources Commission is a state agency charged with overseeing Virginia's marine and aquatic resources, and its tidal waters and homelands.  One of the primary functions of the Commission is to zone water areas for outdoor swimming, for oyster and clamming grounds, and for fishing use.

See also
Virginia Marine Police
Virginia Department of Wildlife Resources

References

External links
Official Website for the Virginia Marine Resources Commission
Chronological History of the Virginia Marine Resources Commission
Current Virginia Recreational Saltwater Fishing Regulations
Current Virginia Commercial Saltwater Fishing Regulations

State law enforcement agencies of Virginia
State agencies of Virginia